Beatles for Sale No. 2 is an EP released by the Beatles on 4 June 1965. The EP was only released in mono. Its catalogue number is Parlophone GEP 8938. It was also released in Australia.

Track listing
All songs written and composed by Lennon-McCartney, except 'Words of Love', which was written and composed by Buddy Holly.

Side A
"I'll Follow the Sun" – 1:46
"Baby's in Black" – 2:05

Side B
"Words of Love" – 2:04
"I Don't Want to Spoil the Party" – 2:34

Personnel
George Harrison – lead guitar, backing vocals on 'I Don't Want to Spoil the Party'
John Lennon – vocals, rhythm guitar
Paul McCartney – vocals, bass guitar
Ringo Starr – drums, percussion

References

1965 EPs
Albums produced by George Martin
The Beatles EPs
Parlophone EPs